Augusta Pride is the LGBT (lesbian, gay, bisexual, transgender) pride organization in Augusta, Georgia. It hosts a pride parade in downtown Augusta. The event started in 2010.

Pride Festival 
A two-day Augusta Pride Festival is held at the Augusta Commons every June. The festival kicks off with a Friday night concert and dance party known as Beats on Broad which has previously featured headliners Bebe Rexha and Dev.

The second day kicks off with the Augusta Pride Parade down Broad Street in Downtown Augusta before the festival starts with live music and vendors set up at the Augusta Commons for festival goers to enjoy.

See also
 Arts and culture in Augusta, Georgia
 LGBT rights in Georgia (U.S. state)

Footnotes

External links
 Augusta Pride — official website

Culture of Augusta, Georgia
LGBT organizations in the United States
2010 establishments in Georgia (U.S. state)
Recurring events established in 2010
LGBT events in Georgia (U.S. state)
Annual events in Georgia (U.S. state)
Pride parades in Georgia (U.S. state)